Varna Free University "Chernorizets Hrabar" (University Free of Varna) is a private university in Varna, Bulgaria, created in 1991 by resolution of the 37th National Assembly and granted the status of a higher school in 1995. It organizes regular, part-time, and distance learning for its 12,000 students and maintains a campus in the town of Smolyan.

Varna Free University offers 80 undergraduate degrees, 20 master's programs, and 20 accredited PhD research courses. It offers scholarships to students with the highest grades, as well as prominent acting, dancing, and sports talents. The university is institutionally accredited by the National Assessment and Accreditation Agency at the Council of Ministers of Bulgaria, receiving the maximum period (six years) and assessment grade (9.20 out of the possible 10.0). The university is re-certified under the international standard ISO 9001:2008 and has been granted certificates from the United Kingdom Accreditation Service and the ANSI National Accreditation Board for the implementation of accepted international standards.

Varna Free University is the first and only university in Bulgaria certified with DS Label, ECTS Label, and HR by the European Executive Agency for Education and Culture at the European Commission of the European Union.

Faculties and Departments

Faculties 
 Faculty of International Economics and Administration Faculty
 Faculty of Law
 Faculty of Architecture

Departments 
 Department of International Economics and Politics
 Department of Administration and Management
 Department of Computer Studies
 Department of Legal Sciences
 Department of Security and Safety
 Department of Psychology
 Department of Architecture and Urban Studies
 Construction of Buildings and Facilities Department
 Department of Art

References

External links 
 
Student portal
Admissions portal

1991 establishments in Bulgaria
Free
Educational institutions established in 1991